Anton Schär (born 7 June 1942) is a Swiss boxer. He competed in the men's light heavyweight event at the 1972 Summer Olympics.

References

1942 births
Living people
Swiss male boxers
Olympic boxers of Switzerland
Boxers at the 1972 Summer Olympics
Place of birth missing (living people)
Light-heavyweight boxers